Alleyne Clarice Zander (9 February 1893 – 12 October 1958), known professionally as Clarice Zander, was an Australian art curator and gallery manager, born Alleyne Clarice Peel in Coleraine, Victoria. She became known for organizing the British Contemporary Art exhibitions in Melbourne in 1932 and 1933 after moving to London in 1930.

References

Further reading
"Zander, Alleyne Clarice (1893–1958)". Trove. National Library of Australia. Retrieved 27 October 2019.

1893 births
1958 deaths
19th-century Australian women
20th-century Australian women
Australian expatriates in England
People from Coleraine, Victoria